The following is the qualification system and qualified athletes for the racquetball at the 2019 Pan American Games competitions.

Qualification system
A total of 60 racquetball athletes qualified compete. Each nation may enter a maximum of 8 athletes (four per gender). In each gender there will be a total of 30 athletes qualified, with the 2019 Pan American Championships being used to determine the countries qualified. Peru as host nation did not qualify any athletes automatically.

Qualification summary
A total of 15 countries qualified 60 athletes.

Qualification timeline

Men

Women

References

P
Qualification for the 2019 Pan American Games
Racquetball at the 2019 Pan American Games